The Trail Smoke Eaters are a junior A ice hockey team from Trail, British Columbia, Canada. They are a part of the British Columbia Hockey League.

History
The Smoke Eaters (aka Smokies) have existed as both junior and senior teams since the 1920s. The senior Smoke Eaters won two Allan Cup championships, 1938 and 1962, and two Ice Hockey World Championships playing for Canada in 1939 and 1961. The senior Smokies were the last independent ice hockey club to represent Canada in international competition before the Canada men's national ice hockey team was established in 1963.

The junior Smoke Eaters have competed in British Columbia since 1926. Originally, the ice hockey usage of "junior" referred to a general, age-limited, non-professional hockey concept that was distinct from senior and intermediate divisions. Later, the junior divisions in Canada were divided into two levels, Junior A and Junior B. In 1970, Junior A was split again into Major Junior and Junior A. The junior Smoke Eaters have competed in various levels of junior hockey, including Junior A and Junior B divisions. They have also competed for the national Junior Championship Memorial Cup prior to its usage as the Major Junior championship.

In 1931–32, the junior Smoke Eaters won their first of 22 Mowat Cups over a run of 29 seasons.  Throughout this run, the Mowat Cup was awarded as the highest level junior hockey championship for the province.  During their 22 Mowat Cup winning years, the Smoke Eaters represented British Columbia in the Western Canadian Junior/Junior A Championship, the Abbott Cup.  The Smoke Eaters won the Abbott Cup in 1944 and represented Western Canada in the national junior championship Memorial Cup competition, losing all four games to the Oshawa Generals.

By the 1970s, the Smoke Eaters played as a Junior B team in the Kootenay International Junior Hockey League (KIJHL). They joined the Junior A Rocky Mountain Junior Hockey League (RMJHL) from the 1991–92 through 1994–95 seasons. In 1995, the Smoke Eaters bought the Bellingham Ice Hawks franchise in the Junior A British Columbia Hockey League (BCHL), joining that league as the Trail Smoke Eaters for the 1995–96 season.

Season-by-season record
Note: GP = Games Played, W = Wins, L = Losses, T = Ties, OTL = Overtime Losses, GF = Goals for, GA = Goals against

Chilliwack/Ladner/Bellingham franchise
To secure entry into the BCHL, the Trail Smoke Eaters bought the franchise rights of the Bellingham Ice Hawks of Bellingham, Washington.  The Ice Hawks franchise had previously existed in the British Columbia communities of Chilliwack (twice), Langley and Ladner.

Chilliwack Colts 1978–1981
Langley Eagles 1981–1987
Chilliwack Eagles 1987–1989
Ladner Penguins 1989–90
Bellingham Ice Hawks 1990–1995

The Eagles played for six seasons in Langley. Their best season was 1983–84 with a record of 40–8–2, placing third in the league. In the playoffs they defeated the Abbotsford Flyers four games to one, the Nanaimo Clippers four games to two, and then swept the first place Penticton Knights in the league championships. They then won the 1984 Mowat Cup over the Peace Caribou Junior Hockey League champions, Prince George Spruce Kings, and then won the 1984 BC/Alta Championship over Fort Saskatchewan Traders. They lost Abbott Cup to the Weyburn Red Wings in a four-game sweep before the Red Wings went on to win the Centennial Cup.

Note: GP = Games Played, W = Wins, L = Losses, T = Ties, GF = Goals for, GA = Goals against

See also
List of ice hockey teams in British Columbia

External links
Smoke Eaters Website

British Columbia Hockey League teams
1926 establishments in British Columbia
Ice hockey clubs established in 1926
Trail, British Columbia